This page details the records, statistics, and other achievements pertaining to Chris Paul.

NBA career statistics

Regular season

|-
| style="text-align:left;"|
| style="text-align:left;"|New Orleans
| 78 || 78 || 36.0 || .430 || .282 || .847 || 5.1 || 7.8 || 2.2 || .1 || 16.1
|-
| style="text-align:left;"|
| style="text-align:left;"|New Orleans
| 64 || 64 || 36.8 || .437 || .350 || .818 || 4.4 || 8.9 || 1.8 || .0 || 17.3
|-
| style="text-align:left;"|
| style="text-align:left;"|New Orleans
| 80 || 80 || 37.6 || .488 || .369 || .851 || 4.0 || style="background:#cfecec;"|11.6* || style="background:#cfecec;"|2.7* || .1 || 21.1
|-
| style="text-align:left;"|
| style="text-align:left;"|New Orleans
| 78 || 78 || 38.5 || .503 || .364 || .868 || 5.5 || style="background:#cfecec;"|11.0* || style="background:#cfecec;"|2.8* || .1 || 22.8
|-
| style="text-align:left;"|
| style="text-align:left;"|New Orleans
| 45 || 45 || 38.0 || .493 || .409 || .847 || 4.2 || 10.7 || 2.1 || .2 || 18.7
|-
| style="text-align:left;"|
| style="text-align:left;"|New Orleans
| 80 || 80 || 36.0 || .463 || .388 || .878 || 4.1 || 9.8 || style="background:#cfecec;"|2.4* || .1 || 15.8
|-
| style="text-align:left;"|
| style="text-align:left;"|L.A. Clippers
| 60 || 60 || 36.4 || .478 || .371 || .861 || 3.6 || 9.1 || style="background:#cfecec;"|2.5* || .1 || 19.8
|-
| style="text-align:left;"|
| style="text-align:left;"|L.A. Clippers
| 70 || 70 || 33.4 || .481 || .328 || .885 || 3.7 || 9.7 || style="background:#cfecec;"|2.4* || .1 || 16.9
|-
| style="text-align:left;"|
| style="text-align:left;"|L.A. Clippers
| 62 || 62 || 35.0 || .467 || .368 || .855 || 4.3 || style="background:#cfecec;"|10.7* ||style="background:#cfecec;"|2.5* || .1 || 19.1
|-
| style="text-align:left;"|
| style="text-align:left;"|L.A. Clippers
| 82 || style="background:#cfecec;"|82* || 34.8 || .485 || .398 || .900 || 4.6 || style="background:#cfecec;"|10.2* || 1.9 || .2 || 19.1
|-
| style="text-align:left;"|
| style="text-align:left;"|L.A. Clippers
| 74 || 74 || 32.7 || .462 || .371 || .896 || 4.2 || 10.0 || 2.1 || .2 || 19.5
|-
| style="text-align:left;"|
| style="text-align:left;"|L.A. Clippers
| 61 || 61 || 31.5 || .476 || .411 || .892 || 5.0 || 9.2 || 1.9 || .1 || 18.1
|-
| style="text-align:left;"|
| style="text-align:left;"|Houston
| 58 || 58 || 31.8 || .460 || .380 || .919 || 5.4 || 7.9 || 1.7 || .2 || 18.6
|-
| style="text-align:left;"|
| style="text-align:left;"|Houston
| 58 || 58 || 32.0 || .419 || .358 || .862 || 4.6 || 8.2 || 2.0 || .3 || 15.6
|-
| style="text-align:left;"|
| style="text-align:left;"|Oklahoma City
| 70 || 70 || 31.5 || .489 || .365 || .907 || 5.0 || 6.7 || 1.6 || .2 || 17.6
|- class="sortbottom"
| style="text-align:center;" colspan="2"|Career
| 1020 || 1020 || 34.9 || .471 || .370 || .870 || 4.5 || 9.5 || 2.2 || .1 || 18.5
|- class="sortbottom"
| style="text-align:center;" colspan="2"|All-Star
| 10 || 4 || 27.0 || .530 || .468 || .857 || 4.3 || 12.8 || 2.6 || .0 || 13.4

Playoffs

|-
| style="text-align:left;"|2008
| style="text-align:left;"|New Orleans
| 12 || 12 || 40.5 || .502 || .238 || .785 || 4.9 || 11.3 || 2.3 || .2 || 24.1
|-
| style="text-align:left;"|2009
| style="text-align:left;"|New Orleans
| 5 || 5 || 40.2 || .411 || .313 || .857 || 4.4 || 10.4 || 1.6 || .0 || 16.6
|-
| style="text-align:left;"|2011
| style="text-align:left;"|New Orleans
| 6 || 6 || 41.5 || .545 || .474 || .796 || 6.7 || 11.5 || 1.8 || .0 || 22.0
|-
| style="text-align:left;"|2012
| style="text-align:left;"|L.A. Clippers
| 11 || 11 || 38.5 || .427 || .333 || .872 || 5.1 || 7.9 || 2.7 || .1 || 17.6
|-
| style="text-align:left;"|2013
| style="text-align:left;"|L.A. Clippers
| 6 || 6 || 37.3 || .533 || .316 || .892 || 4.0 || 6.3 || 1.8 || .0 || 22.8
|-
| style="text-align:left;"|2014
| style="text-align:left;"|L.A. Clippers
| 13 || 13 || 36.3 || .467 || .457 || .774 || 4.2 || 10.4 || 2.8 || .0 || 19.8
|-
| style="text-align:left;"|2015
| style="text-align:left;"|L.A. Clippers
| 12 || 12 || 37.1 || .503 || .415 || .941 || 4.4 || 8.8 || 1.8 || .3 || 22.1
|-
| style="text-align:left;"|2016
| style="text-align:left;"|L.A. Clippers
| 4 || 4 || 31.3 || .487 || .300 || 1.000 || 4.0 || 7.3 || 2.3 || .0 || 23.8
|-
| style="text-align:left;"|2017
| style="text-align:left;"|L.A. Clippers
| 7 || 7 || 37.2 || .496 || .368 || .879 || 5.0 || 9.9 || 1.7 || .1 || 25.3
|-
| style="text-align:left;"|2018
| style="text-align:left;"|Houston
| 15 || 15 || 34.5 || .459 || .374 || .830 || 5.9 || 5.8 || 2.0 || .3 || 21.1
|-
| style="text-align:left;"|2019
| style="text-align:left;"|Houston
| 11 || 11 || 36.1 || .446 || .270 || .844 || 6.4 || 5.5 || 2.2 || .6 || 17.0
|-
| style="text-align:left;"|2020
| style="text-align:left;"|Oklahoma City
| 7 || 7 || 37.3 || .491 || .372 || .885 || 7.4 || 5.3 || 1.6 || .4 || 21.3
|- class="sortbottom"
| style="text-align:center;" colspan="2"|Career
| 109 || 109 || 37.3 || .478 || .365 || .847 || 5.2 || 8.3 || 2.1 || .2 || 20.9

Awards and honors

NBA
12× NBA All-Star: 2008, 2009, 2010, 2011, 2012, 2013, 2014, 2015, 2016, 2020, 2021, 2022
11× All-NBA Team:
4× First Team: 2008, 2012, 2013, 2014
5× Second Team: 2009, 2015, 2016, 2020, 2021
2× Third Team: 2011, 2022
9× NBA All-Defensive Team:
7× First Team: 2009, 2012, 2013, 2014, 2015, 2016, 2017
2× Second Team: 2008, 2011
NBA All-Star Game Most Valuable Player Award: 2013
NBA Rookie of the Year: 2006
NBA All-Rookie First Team: 2006

College
 No. 3 retired by Wake Forest
 2× All-ACC Team
 All-ACC First Team: 2005
 All-ACC Third Team: 2004
 All-ACC Defensive Team: 2004
 All-ACC Freshman Team: 2004
 ACC Rookie of the Year: 2004
 All-ACC Tournament Second Team: 2004

United States National Team
2× Olympic gold medalist: 2008, 2012
FIBA World Championship bronze medalist: 2006
USA Basketball Male Athlete of the Year: 2004

NBA achievements

Regular season
1st place all-time for consecutive games with a steal with 109.
1st place all-time for highest assists per game average in All-Star games.
1st place all-time for most seasons leading the league in total steals with 5.
1st place all-time for most seasons leading the league in steals per game with 6.
2nd place all-time for NBA All-Star games with at least 10 assists with 5.
Only player in NBA history to record at least 40 points, 15 assists, and 5 steals in a game.
Only player in NBA history to record at least 20 points, 20 assists with 0 turnovers in a game.
Only player in NBA history to record at least 10 points and 10 assists in each of the first 13 games of a season.
Only player in NBA history to lead the league in assists per game and steals per game in the same season, three times.
Only player in NBA history to lead the league in steals per game in four consecutive seasons.
Only player in NBA history to lead the league in steals per game in a single season for at least six seasons.
Only player in NBA history with 6,000 assists through his first 9 seasons and not reach the Conference Finals in that span.

Playoffs
 One of three players in NBA history to record at least 25 points, 15 assists, and 10 rebounds in a playoff game.
 Includes Oscar Robertson (achieved this twice) and Russell Westbrook.

New Orleans Hornets/Pelicans franchise records

Regular season

Career 
 Free throws: 100
 Free throw attempts: 1
 Assists: 1
 Steals: 1
 Turnovers: 1
 Assists per game: 1
 Steals per game: 1

Season 
 Free throws: 1
 Free throw attempts: 1
 Assists: 1
 Steals: 1
 Assists per game: 1
 Steals per game: 1

Los Angeles Clippers franchise records

Regular season

Career 
 Assists: 4023
 Assists per game: 9.8
 Steals per game: 2.3

Season 
 Steals per game: 2.5

References

Paul, Chris